California State University, Dominguez Hills, also known as CSUDH, CSU Dominguez Hills, or Cal State Dominguez Hills, is a public university located in the city of Carson, California, in the South Bay region of Los Angeles County and was founded in 1960. The university is part of the 23-school California State University system. It offers 45 majors for bachelor's degrees, 22 different master's degrees, and 17 types of teaching credentials. The university does not confer doctoral degrees.

Since its establishment in 1960, the university has had eight permanent presidents. While eleven people have served as president, four served interim terms: John A. Brownell from 1987 to 1989, Herbert Carter from 1998 to 1999, Boice Bowman in 2007, and Willie J. Hagan from 2012 to 2013. However, Hagan was appointed the seventh permanent president and served an additional five-year term as president from 2013 to 2018. Thomas A. Parham is the current president of the university.

By name and years of service, they are:

 Leo F. Cain (1962–1976)
 Donald R. Gerth (1976–1984)
 Richard Butwell (1984–1987)
 John A. Brownell (Interim 1987–1989)
 Robert C. Detweiler (1989–1998)
 Herbert Carter (Interim 1998–1999)
 James E. Lyons, Sr. (1999–2007)
 Boice Bowman (Interim 2007)
 Mildred García (2007–2012)
 Willie J. Hagan (Interim 2012–2013; 2013–2018)
 Thomas A. Parham (since 2018)

External links
California State University. Past & Present Leadership

References

California State University, Dominguez Hills
Dominguez Hills
Educational institutions established in 1960
1960 establishments in California
Universities and colleges in Los Angeles County, California
Schools accredited by the Western Association of Schools and Colleges